is a Japanese manga series in webtoon format written and illustrated by Yayoiso. The individual chapters were released by NHN Japan on the Comico website from October 12, 2013, to March 16, 2018, for a total of 15 compiled tankōbon volumes published by Earth Star Entertainment. An anime television series adaptation animated by TMS Entertainment was announced on February 13, 2015, and premiered on television on July 2, 2016. On June 24, 2016, the series was released in full on the web. A live action film adaptation of the same name was released in 2017. In 2017, the manga won in France's Mangawa Award.

Plot 
The story revolves around 27-year-old Arata Kaizaki, a NEET who has been unemployed (while also lying about having a job) for several years; only working part-time at a convenience store. One day, a mysterious man named Ryō Yoake offers him a job opportunity. At first, Kaizaki needs to become a tester for ReLife: a science experiment to make him appear 10 years younger to send him back as a high school student. The experiment is supposed to provide a chance to experience youth once again and, in the process, fix whatever is wrong with the subject's life.

Characters 
 

Played by: Taishi Nakagawa
 Arata is a 27-year old man who became unemployed after quitting his job of 3 months at a black company, claiming the reason was "it did not fit his highest potential". After several failed job interviews with other companies, usually because he got nervous when asked why he would leave a job after only three months. He ended up working part-time at a convenience store where he was scouted by An Onoya who chose him for the ReLife Project. As a high school student who only appears to be 17-years old, Arata is predictably seen as mature by his classmates and has no problem easily making friends. He has forgotten most of his high school lessons, so he needs to take many remedial tests. He prevents himself from falling in love due to his (real) age and the after-effect of the pill he must take after the experiment ends, even though Ryō encourages him to "live the ReLife to its finest". He is currently the Project #002 from Kanto prefecture.
He actually graduated from college and started working in the company. His older female co-worker, Saiki, was being harassed by her male co-workers. He tried to help her, but it only increased the harassment, leading to Saiki rejecting his help and eventually committing suicide. This tragedy left him traumatized and he subsequently quit his job. At the end of the manga, he is given a job at ReLIFE and starts a relationship with Chizuru after learning she was a subject too. His surname comes from Kaizaki Station.

 

Played by: Yuna Taira
A very smart but socially awkward classmate of Arata. She usually scores the top grades in her year, which makes her the class representative and has all her school expenses paid for as a result. She is not only socially awkward but also fairly ignorant with regards to anything not directly related to school matters, particularly social and emotional ones. She's always doing research online on whatever she doesn't understand. It is revealed that she was a ReLIFE subject too and had two terms. She falls in love with Arata and starts (correctly) to suspect he is a subject too. At the end of the manga, she gets a job at ReLIFE and starts a relationship with Arata. Her surname comes from Hishiro Station.

Played by: Yudai Chiba
Kaizaki's ReLife supervisor, the man who offered him the ReLife experiment. He is at the same age as Arata and always seems cheerful (which in fact irritates Kaizaki to no end). Being the supervisor, he always watches over Arata from a distance and writes reports about his daily life. Later he starts a relationship with An. His surname comes from Yoake Station.

Played by: Elaiza Ikeda
Arata's female classmate who sits next to him and is a volleyball club member. She is very competitive, and she wants to be the best at everything. She thinks of Chizuru and Honoka as her rivals, but is on good terms with them. Rena is stubborn and proud, but actually genuinely confused inside. She has crush on Kazuomi Ōga and acts like a tsundere towards him. Later she and Kazuomi Ōga become a couple. Her surname comes from Kariu Station.

Played by: Mahiro Takasugi
Arata's classmate who is the class representative along with Chizuru. He performs well academically but has very poor athletic abilities. He lacks social prowess when it comes to romance, with the help of Arata and their friends he realizes his feelings for Rena, claiming that he wants to be with her, and doesn't want her to be with another guy. He wears his uniform in a particularly eye-catching way, earning him the nickname  or just "Flashy Blond Guy". His surname comes from Ōga Station. His older brother was once a cheerful man who became a NEET due to heavy pressure and later is chosen to take part in the ReLife program as Project #005 by Arata Kaizaki in the last chapter ch222.

Played by: Sae Okazaki
An is another "transfer student" at Aoba High School. But she's actually Ryō's junior supervisor and the one who scouted Arata for the experiment. Like Ryō, she acts cheerfully and together with watching their project to the point it becomes stalking, much to Arata's annoyance. Later she starts a relationship with Ryo. Her surname comes from Onoya Station.

Rena's best friend and the captain of the female volleyball team. A naive, friendly, and sweet girl and she has noticeably well-endowed which a bit of the running gag. Having a strong aptitude and athletic ability, she felt pressure from people who can't surpass her, which is why Rena's claim to be her rival makes Honoka treasure their friendship. Despite being a genius at sports, she isn't very good academically. Her surname comes from Tamarai Station.

 

He is Honoka and Nobunaga's childhood friend. He has sharp and glaring eyes. He is very protective of Honoka and he gets mad at anyone caught leering at her. His surname comes from Inukai Station.

Honoka and Akira's childhood friend, he acts like the mother of the group and a member of the health committee. His surname comes from Asaji Station.

 

Played by: Natsuna Watanabe
Homeroom teacher at Arata's class. She is a PE teacher and coaches female volleyball club. Her surname comes from Amatsu Station.

 

Male volleyball supervisor and a PE teacher. He was Kokoro's senior at university and they are sort of rivals. His surname comes from Usa Station.

  

Public health doctor of Aoba Academy. She's also Akira's older sister. Her surname comes from Inukai Station.

  

Michiru was a staff member of the black company Arata was employed. She later committed suicide after being harassed by fellow employees. Her suicide had a great impact on Arata, rendering him unable to function in society. Her surname comes from Saiki Station.

Media

Manga
The manga began publication on the Comico app in 2013 with physical publication of the series following in 2014. The series was added to the streaming service Crunchyroll manga service on December 21, 2015. As of the March 5, 2018, Crunchyroll no longer hosts the manga.

Several new chapters were also published by Yayoiso but are not for sale on Amazon. These episodes are available as online reader on the Comico (NHN Japan) official website and many others. English translation is also available for this manga on Comico's English website Pocket Comics. The last Report is 222 Named: "Restart Life". In volume 15, two bonus chapters, were added. The first is an epilogue. It picks up the same night Chizuru and Arata regain their memories of each other, and ends just over 4 years later. The other bonus chapter was a prologue, which covers how Arata was chosen to be a subject.

Anime
It was announced on February 13, 2015, that the webtoon series would be getting an anime television adaptation that is scheduled to air on July 2, 2016. The anime's main cast, broadcast information and first key visual was unveiled at the AnimeJapan 2016 convention in Japan on March 26, 2016. TMS Entertainment is producing the series, with Satoru Kosaka directing, Michiko Yokote and Kazuho Hyodo handling series composition, Junko Yamanaka designing the characters, and Masayasu Tsuboguchi composing the music. All 13 episodes of the anime were pre-streamed before the television broadcast on the ReLIFE Channel app on June 24, 2016. Crunchyroll released all episodes of the anime for premium members on July 1, 2016, each episode was made available for free members throughout the following weeks. The anime is licensed in North America by Crunchyroll, and Funimation released it on home video with an English dub.

A 4-episode finale was streamed on Amazon Prime Video and released on Blu-ray & DVD on March 21, 2018.

Episode list

Music
The opening theme is "Button" by Penguin Research, while various artists perform a different ending theme for each episode. The ending songs are compiled into one album titled "MD2000 ~ReLIFE Ending Songs~" to be released on September 21, 2016. The title "MD2000" comes from a type of mini disc that came out in 2000 while the concept of the ending themes comes from the songs that Kaizaki used to hear back in his (old) high school days.

A series of character songs also released from August 3, 2016, started with Arata Kaizaki from volume 1. Each CD contains two songs with a respective instrumental version. A soundtrack CD containing 23 pieces of background music from the anime is released on September 14, 2016. The music is composed by Masayusu Tzboguchi.

List of Ending Songs

List of Character Songs

Live action film

A live action film adaptation of the same name and directed by Takeshi Furusawa was released in Japanese theaters on April 15, 2017. The film stars Taishi Nakagawa and Yuna Taira as Arata Kaizaki and Chizuru Hishiro, respectively. The film was given an original ending.

Stage play
A stage play adaptation was performed in Tokyo and Osaka in late 2016.

Reception
Volume 1 reached the 30th place on the weekly Oricon manga charts and, as of August 17, 2014, had sold 33,637 copies; volume 2 reached the 9th place and, as of November 16, 2014, had sold 46,040 copies; volume 3 reached the 23rd place and, as of April 5, 2015, had sold 73,019 copies.

It was placed 6th in Zenkoku Shotenin ga Eranda Osusume Comic 2015. It was also nominated for Best General Manga at the 39th Kodansha Manga Awards. The series ranked sixth in the first Next Manga Award in the print manga category. The series had sold 1 million copies as of February 8, 2016. As of October 2016, the manga had been downloaded over 20 million times.

References

External links
ReLIFE on www.comico.jp 
ReLIFE on comic-earthstar.jp 
ReLIFE on pocketcomics.com 
 
Official live action website 

2016 anime television series debuts
2010s webtoons
2013 webtoon debuts
2014 manga
Aniplex
Crunchyroll anime
Drama anime and manga
Drama webtoons
Earth Star Entertainment manga
Funimation
Japanese webtoons
Manga adapted into films
Manga adapted into television series
Romance anime and manga
Seinen manga
Television shows based on Japanese webtoons
TMS Entertainment
Tokyo MX original programming
Webtoons in print